Turning Tide (original title: En solitaire) is a 2013 French drama film directed by Christophe Offenstein.

Plot 
Yann Kermadec has short notice to replace the main skipper in the Vendée Globe. After a few days of racing, Yann is first but he has to make a forced stop to repair his damaged rudder. His world tour is going to be bowled ...

Cast 

 François Cluzet as Yann Kermadec
 Samy Seghir as Mano Ixa
 Virginie Efira as Marie Drevil
 Guillaume Canet as Frank Drevil
 Jean-Paul Rouve as Denis Juhel
 Karine Vanasse as Mag Embling
 Arly Jover as Anna Bruckner
 José Coronado as José Monzon
 Philippe Lefebvre as Raphaël Keriou
 Dana Prigent as Léa Kermadec
 Guillaume Nicloux as The Race Director
 Emmanuelle Bercot as The Doctor
 Léa Fazer as The Mother
 Laure Duthilleul as The Teacher
 Stéphan Guérin-Tillié 
 Steve Suissa

Accolades

References

External links 

2013 films
French drama films
2013 drama films
Gaumont Film Company films
Competitive sailing films
2013 directorial debut films
2010s French-language films
2010s French films